David J. Butler (born 30 March 1953) is an English former football striker who played professionally in England, the North American Soccer League and Major Indoor Soccer League.

Butler began his career as a sixteen-year-old apprentice with West Bromwich Albion before moving to Shrewsbury Town in 1973. He also played ten games on loan to Workington A.F.C. during the 1973–1974 season. In 1974, Shrewsbury Town released Butler when he received an offer to play for the Seattle Sounders of the North American Soccer League. He signed with the Sounders and played through the 1978 season with them. In 1979, he played a single season with the Portland Timbers before moving indoors with the Pittsburgh Spirit for the 1979–1980 Major Indoor Soccer League season. In 1983, he returned to the Sounders to coach the reserve team and played 1 more first team game.

References

External links
NASL career stats

1953 births
Living people
Baltimore Blast (1980–1992) players
English footballers
English expatriate footballers
Expatriate soccer players in the United States
Kansas City Comets (original MISL) players
Major Indoor Soccer League (1978–1992) players
North American Soccer League (1968–1984) players
North American Soccer League (1968–1984) indoor players
Philadelphia Fever (MISL) players
Pittsburgh Spirit players
Portland Timbers (1975–1982) players
Seattle Sounders (1974–1983) players
Shrewsbury Town F.C. players
English Football League players
West Bromwich Albion F.C. players
Workington A.F.C. players
English expatriate sportspeople in the United States
Association football forwards